Manchenky is an urban-type settlement in Kharkiv Raion of Kharkiv Oblast in Ukraine. Manchenky belongs to Liubotyn urban hromada, one of the hromadas of Ukraine. Population:

Economy

Transportation
Manchenky railway station is on the railway connecting Kharkiv with Bohodukhiv and Sumy. There is local passenger traffic.

The settlement has access to Highway M03 which connects Kharkiv with Kyiv.

References

Urban-type settlements in Kharkiv Raion